Diplosoma is a genus of flowering plants belonging to the family Aizoaceae.

Its native range is South African Republic.

Species:

Diplosoma luckhoffii 
Diplosoma retroversum

References

Aizoaceae
Aizoaceae genera